Chalermsakdi Inswang (born 7 November 1926) is a Thai former sports shooter. He competed in the 50 metre pistol event at the 1960 Summer Olympics and 1962 Asian Games.

References

External links
 

1926 births
Possibly living people
Chalermsakdi Inswang
Chalermsakdi Inswang
Shooters at the 1960 Summer Olympics
Chalermsakdi Inswang
Shooters at the 1962 Asian Games
Chalermsakdi Inswang
Chalermsakdi Inswang